The Pau Cin Hau scripts, known as Pau Cin Hau lai ('Pau Cin Hau script'), or Zo tual lai ('Zo indigenous script') in Zomi, are two scripts, a logographic script and an alphabetic script created by Pau Cin Hau, a Zomi religious leader from Chin State, Burma. The logographic script consists of 1,050 characters, which is a traditionally significant number based on the number of characters appearing in a religious text. The alphabetic script is a simplified script of 57 characters, which is divided into 21 consonants, 7 vowels, 9 final consonants, and 20 tone, length, and glottal marks. The original script was produced in 1902, but it is thought to have undergone at least two revisions, of which the first revision produced the logographic script.

The logographic script has not been encoded, but the alphabetic script has been encoded in Unicode 7.0.

The characters in the script seem to resemble characters in the Latin script and in the Burmese script in a way similar to the relationship between Pahawh Hmong and both Lao script and Latin script. They are glyphically similar but encode different phonological values.

The script was designed for the Zomi language but is able to transcribe other Zo languages, as there are additional letters and tone marks to represent sounds present in other Chin languages but not present in Zomi. The script also had limited use for Christian literature in the region, as is evidenced by some Baptist documents produced in 1931-32 in Burma.

Unicode

The Pau Cin Hau alphabet was added to the Unicode Standard in June, 2014 with the release of version 7.0.

The Unicode block for the Pau Cin Hau alphabet is U+11AC0–U+11AFF:

Fonts
Google's Noto fonts have developed a font, Noto Sans Pau Cin Hau, which supports the Pau Cin Hau script. Download here:

References

External links 
 Noto Sans Pau Cin Hau

Kuki-Chin languages
Writing systems of Asia